George Stanley Peachment VC (5 May 1897 – 25 September 1915) was an English recipient of the Victoria Cross, the highest and most prestigious award for gallantry in the face of the enemy that can be awarded to British and Commonwealth forces.

Before he joined up in April 1915, Peachment was an apprentice steam engine maker in Bury, Lancashire. He enlisted at only 17 years and 11 months old giving a false age. He joined the 6th battalion, King's Royal Rifle Corps, later transferring to the 2nd battalion.

Peachment was a private in the 2nd Battalion, The King's Royal Rifle Corps, British Army during World War I at the Battle of Loos, on 25 September 1915 near Hulluch, France, when his actions led to the award of the Victoria Cross.

His citation in the London Gazette reads:

Peachment at 18 years and 4 months was the second youngest army recipient of the VC in World War I, after John Cornwell.

His medal is held in the Lord Ashcroft VC Collection at the Imperial War Museum.

References

Monuments to Courage (David Harvey, 1999)
The Register of the Victoria Cross (This England, 1997)
VCs of the First World War - The Western Front 1915 (Peter F. Batchelor & Christopher Matson, 1999)

British World War I recipients of the Victoria Cross
British Army personnel of World War I
British military personnel killed in World War I
People from Bury, Greater Manchester
1897 births
1915 deaths
King's Royal Rifle Corps soldiers
British Army recipients of the Victoria Cross
Military personnel from Lancashire